The 6th parallel south is a circle of latitude that is 6 degrees south of the Earth's equatorial plane. It crosses the Atlantic Ocean, Africa, the Indian Ocean, Southeast Asia, Australasia, the Pacific Ocean and South America.

Around the world
Starting at the Prime Meridian and heading eastwards, the parallel 6° south passes through:

{| class="wikitable plainrowheaders"
! scope="col" width="125" | Co-ordinates
! scope="col" | Country, territory or sea
! scope="col" | Notes
|-
| style="background:#b0e0e6;" | 
! scope="row" style="background:#b0e0e6;" | Atlantic Ocean
| style="background:#b0e0e6;" |
|-valign="top"
| 
! scope="row" | Democratic Republic of the Congo
|
|-
| 
! scope="row" | Angola
|
|-valign="top"
| 
! scope="row" | Democratic Republic of the Congo
|
|-
| style="background:#b0e0e6;" | 
! scope="row" style="background:#b0e0e6;" | Lake Tanganyika
| style="background:#b0e0e6;" |
|-
| 
! scope="row" | Tanzania
|
|-
| style="background:#b0e0e6;" | 
! scope="row" style="background:#b0e0e6;" | Indian Ocean
| style="background:#b0e0e6;" | Zanzibar Channel
|-
| 
! scope="row" | Tanzania
| Island of Zanzibar
|-valign="top"
| style="background:#b0e0e6;" | 
! scope="row" style="background:#b0e0e6;" | Indian Ocean
| style="background:#b0e0e6;" | Passing through the Amirante Islands, Seychelles Passing just south of Île Platte, Seychelles Passing just north of the Eagle Islands and Three Brothers, British Indian Ocean Territory Passing just south of the island of Sumatra, Indonesia
|-
| 
! scope="row" | Indonesia
| Passing just north of Cilegon City, Indonesia
|-
| style="background:#b0e0e6;" | 
! scope="row" style="background:#b0e0e6;" | Jakarta Bay
| style="background:#b0e0e6;" |
|-
| 
! scope="row" | Indonesia
| Passing north of Bekasi Regency, Indonesia
|-valign="top"
| style="background:#b0e0e6;" | 
! scope="row" style="background:#b0e0e6;" | Java Sea
| style="background:#b0e0e6;" | Passing just south of the island of Karimun Jawa, Indonesia Passing just south of the island of Bawean, Indonesia
|-
| 
! scope="row" | Indonesia
| Island of Selayar
|-
| style="background:#b0e0e6;" | 
! scope="row" style="background:#b0e0e6;" | Banda Sea
| style="background:#b0e0e6;" |
|-
| 
! scope="row" | Indonesia
| Island of Binongko
|-
| style="background:#b0e0e6;" | 
! scope="row" style="background:#b0e0e6;" | Banda Sea
| style="background:#b0e0e6;" |
|-
| 
! scope="row" | Indonesia
| Island of Tanimbar Kei
|-valign="top"
| style="background:#b0e0e6;" | 
! scope="row" style="background:#b0e0e6;" | Arafura Sea
| style="background:#b0e0e6;" | Passing just south of the islands of Kai Kecil and Kai Besar, Indonesia Passing just north of the island of Maikoor, Indonesia
|-
| 
! scope="row" | Indonesia
| Islands of Tanahbesar and Kobroor
|-
| style="background:#b0e0e6;" | 
! scope="row" style="background:#b0e0e6;" | Arafura Sea
| style="background:#b0e0e6;" |
|-
| 
! scope="row" | Indonesia
| Island of New Guinea
|-
| 
! scope="row" | Papua New Guinea
| Island of New Guinea
|-
| style="background:#b0e0e6;" | 
! scope="row" style="background:#b0e0e6;" | Solomon Sea
| style="background:#b0e0e6;" | 
|-
| 
! scope="row" | Papua New Guinea
| Island of New Britain
|-
| style="background:#b0e0e6;" | 
! scope="row" style="background:#b0e0e6;" | Solomon Sea
| style="background:#b0e0e6;" | 
|-
| 
! scope="row" | Papua New Guinea
| Bougainville Island
|-valign="top"
| style="background:#b0e0e6;" | 
! scope="row" style="background:#b0e0e6;" | Pacific Ocean
| style="background:#b0e0e6;" | Passing between Roncador Reef and Ontong Java Atoll, Solomon Islands Passing between Nanumea atoll and Nanumanga island, Tuvalu Passing just north of Niutao island, Tuvalu Passing just south of Starbuck Island, Kiribati
|-
| 
! scope="row" | Peru
| Passing just north of Moyobamba
|-valign="top"
| 
! scope="row" | Brazil
| Amazonas Pará Tocantins Maranhão Piauí Ceará Rio Grande do Norte - passing just south of Natal
|-
| style="background:#b0e0e6;" | 
! scope="row" style="background:#b0e0e6;" | Atlantic Ocean
| style="background:#b0e0e6;" |
|}

See also
5th parallel south
7th parallel south

s06